Dresden is a southern district of Stoke-on-Trent, Staffordshire, England, on Trentham Road (A5035) south of Longton.

The district was developed in the 1850s by a housing society in an area formerly called Spratslade.

Notable people
 The composer Havergal Brian was born in Dresden in 1876.
 The area was home to Dresden United F.C., a football team which was active in the late 19th century.
 The film and television actor Freddie Jones was born in Villiers Street, Dresden, in 1927.

References

Areas of Stoke-on-Trent